"Kingdom Come" is a song performed by Swedish singer Anna Bergendahl. The song was performed for the first time by her in Melodifestivalen 2020, where it made it to the final. Bergendahl finished in third place with the song, scoring a total of 107 points. Subsequently, the song peaked at number 9 on the Swedish single chart.

At Melodifestivalen, Anna Bergendahl performed the song with dancers at the stage. On 28 March 2020, Anna Bergendahl performed a softer variation of the song in TV 4's Nyhetsmorgon, accompanied by the acoustic guitar.

Charts

References

2020 singles
English-language Swedish songs
Melodifestivalen songs of 2020
Anna Bergendahl songs
Songs written by Bobby Ljunggren
Songs written by Thomas G:son
Songs written by Erik Bernholm